

Karl-Friedrich von der Meden (3 December 1896 – 26 December 1961) was a general in the Wehrmacht of Nazi Germany during World War II. He was a recipient of the Knight's Cross of the Iron Cross.

Awards and decorations

 Knight's Cross of the Iron Cross on 8 August 1941 as Oberstleutnant and commander of Radfahr-Abteilung 12

Notes

References

Citations

Bibliography

 
 

1896 births
1961 deaths
People from Iława County
People from West Prussia
Lieutenant generals of the German Army (Wehrmacht)
German Army personnel of World War I
Prussian Army personnel
Recipients of the clasp to the Iron Cross, 2nd class
Recipients of the Knight's Cross of the Iron Cross
Reichswehr personnel